The 2005 Jharkhand Legislative Assembly election was held in three phases from 3 to 23 February 2005 to elect the 81 members of the Jharkhand Legislative Assembly. It was the first election held in Jharkhand to elect the Second Jharkhand Legislative Assembly; the First/Interim Jharkhand Legislative Assembly was constituted based on the 2000 Bihar Legislative Assembly election. Jharkhand was created by carving out the southern districts of Bihar on 15 November 2000. The election resulted in a hung assembly like the first one. No single party or pre-election alliance got the majority. The Bharatiya Janata Party become the biggest party by winning 30 seats. The Jharkhand Mukti Morcha got 17 seats and the Indian National Congress got nine seats.

Background
After the formation of Jharkhand on 15 November 2000, the first Legislative Assembly of Jharkhand was constituted by the MLAs elected in the 2000 Bihar Legislative Assembly election, whose constituencies were in the newly formed Jharkhand. The 2005 election was the first one being conducted in Jharkhand.

Results

Elected members

References

External links

State Assembly elections in Jharkhand
2000s in Jharkhand
Jharkhand
November 2005 events in India
December 2005 events in India